Luigi Cavalieri (born 22 April 1914; date of death unknown) was an Italian bobsledder who competed from the late 1940s to the early 1950s. He competed in two Winter Olympics, and earned his best finish (6th place) in the four-man event at St. Moritz in 1948.

References
1948 bobsleigh four-man results
1952 bobsleigh two-man results
1952 bobsleigh four-man results
Luigi Cavalieri's profile at Sports Reference.com

Olympic bobsledders of Italy
Bobsledders at the 1948 Winter Olympics
Bobsledders at the 1952 Winter Olympics
Italian male bobsledders
1914 births
Year of death missing